"You Proof" is a song by American country music singer Morgan Wallen. It was released as a promotional single on May 13, 2022, before being released to country radio on July 18, 2022. The song was written by Wallen, along with Ashley Gorley, Ernest Keith Smith, and Charlie Handsome and is the lead single from Wallen's third studio album One Thing at a Time.

Content
The song is about "drinking away the memory of a previous lover." Its main instrument is acoustic guitar.

Wallen released it to honor his 29th birthday. 

The song was then featured on Season 1, Episode 6, of
the CBS Series Fire Country, which first aired November 18, 2022.

Chart performance
"You Proof" debuted at number one on the Billboard Hot Country Songs chart for May 23, 2022, replacing Wallen's own “Wasted on You”. It is Wallen's fifth single to debut at the top of that chart. It also peaked at number 5 on the Billboard Hot 100 becoming his highest charting song on the chart, surpassing "7 Summers", which peaked at number 6. It spent five consecutive weeks at number one on Country Airplay starting with the chart dated October 15, 2022 before falling to number 2 and being dethroned at the top by Tyler Hubbard's "5 Foot 9" on November 19. The following week, it remained at number 2, having been leapfrogged by Thomas Rhett and Riley Green's "Half of Me". On the chart dated December 3, "You Proof" returned to number one for a sixth week before being dethroned again the following week by Bailey Zimmerman's "Fall in Love". On the chart dated December 17, it again returned to the top for four additional weeks. The song ultimately spent a total of ten non-consecutive weeks at number one. With its time at number one on Country Airplay spanning three separate runs, the song became the first in that chart's history to rebound to the top after multiple songs reached number one in between. In addition, the song's ten-week run atop the Country Airplay chart set a new record for the longest-running number one single in that chart's history, surpassing Lonestar's "Amazed" (1999) and Alan Jackson and Jimmy Buffett's "It's Five O'Clock Somewhere" (2003), which each spent eight weeks at the top.

Music video
The music video directed by Justin Clough and produced by Taylor Vermillion was released on September 9, 2022. It features Charly Jordan as Wallen's love interest who drives recklessly through town and down a back road with Wallen in the backseat. Wallen jumps out of the car, only to realize he had been hallucinating.

Charts

Weekly charts

Year-end charts

Certifications

Release history

Notes

References

2022 songs
Big Loud singles
Mercury Nashville singles
Morgan Wallen songs
Republic Nashville singles
Songs about alcohol
Songs written by Morgan Wallen
Songs written by Ernest (musician)
Songs written by Ashley Gorley
Song recordings produced by Joey Moi